Nsenga may refer to:

 Nsenga people, an ethnic tribe of Zambia and Mozambique
 Nsenga language, spoken by the Nsenga people